Norton High School is Norton, Massachusetts' only public high school. Built in 1973, it underwent renovations that began in June 2011 and were completed in December 2013.

Location 

Norton High School is located near the center of town at 66 West Main St. (Rt. 123).

Clubs and organizations 

Norton High School has 10 clubs and organizations, which include: Recreational Bocce Club, Student Council, Debate Club, DECA (Distributive Education Club of America), Drama Club, Gay-Straight Alliance (GSA), Anime Club, Sci-Fi and Fantasy Club, Yearbook Club, and Students Against Destructive Decisions (SADD)and Newspaper club. At Norton High, students may  join the National, Art, Spanish, French, History, Music, Math, English, and/or Science Honor Societies.

Norton High School allows students to apply themselves in several sports which include:
Fall: Cross Country, Cheerleading, Golf, Soccer, Volleyball, and Football.
Winter: Basketball, Indoor Track, Swimming & Diving, Wrestling, and Hockey.
Spring: Baseball, Softball, Outdoor Track & Field, Tennis, and Lacrosse. Norton High has competed in the Tri-Valley League (TVL) as one of its founding members but left and was replaced by BVT who has also since left the TVL, Norton returned to the TVL in 2002.

Renovations 

The renovations completed in 2013 represent the first changes to the building since it was built in 1973. The building itself needed facility upgrades and expanded classroom space to meet current state standards. This renovation cost the town approximately $12 million.

References

Norton, Massachusetts
Public high schools in Massachusetts
School buildings completed in 1973
Schools in Bristol County, Massachusetts
Educational institutions established in 1973
1973 establishments in Massachusetts